Alvin Carlsson (September 25, 1891 – October 26, 1972) was a Swedish diver who competed in the 1912 Summer Olympics. He finished seventh in the 10 metre platform competition.

References 

1891 births
1972 deaths
Swedish male divers
Olympic divers of Sweden
Divers at the 1912 Summer Olympics